The year 567 BC was a year of the pre-Julian Roman calendar. In the Roman Empire, it was known as year 187 Ab urbe condita. The denomination 567 BC for this year has been used since the early medieval period, when the Anno Domini calendar era became the prevalent method in Europe for naming years.

Events
 Deposed pharaoh Apries invades Egypt with Babylonian help but is defeated by Amasis II.
 May 25—Servius Tullius, king of Rome, celebrates a triumph for his victory over the Etruscans.

Births

Deaths

 Apries, former ruler of ancient Egypt.

References